Gurmukhi is a Unicode block containing characters for the Punjabi language, in the Gurmukhi script. In its original incarnation, the code points U+0A02..U+0A4C were a direct copy of the Gurmukhi characters A2-EC from the 1988 ISCII standard. The Devanagari, Bengali, Gujarati, Oriya, Tamil, Telugu, Kannada, and Malayalam blocks were similarly all based on their ISCII encodings.

Block

History
The following Unicode-related documents record the purpose and process of defining specific characters in the Gurmukhi block:

References 

Unicode blocks